Donald McLeod or Don McLeod may refer to:

Politicians
 Donald Friell McLeod (1810–1872), British Raj Lieutenant Governor of Punjab
 Donald McLeod (Victorian state politician)  (1837–1923), member of the Victorian Legislative Assembly
 Donald Buchanan McLeod (1865–1943), political figure in Nova Scotia, Canada
 Donald McLeod (Minnesota politician) (1912–2009), American farmer, businessman, and politician
 Don McLeod (politician) (1892–1963), Australian politician
 Donald Macleod (politician) (1878–1957), politician from Alberta, Canada
 Donald Norman McLeod (1848–1914), Australian pastoralist and politician
 Donald R. MacLeod (1902–1976), Canadian politician in the Nova Scotia House of Assembly

Sportsmen
 Don McLeod (1946–2015), Canadian ice hockey goaltender
 Don Macleod (footballer) (1917–1999), Scottish footballer (Motherwell FC)
 Donald McLeod (footballer) (1882–1917), Scottish footballer (Celtic FC, Middlesbrough FC, national team)
 Donald MacLeod (cross-country skier) (born 1938), Canadian former cross-country skier
 Donald MacLeod (New Zealand cricketer) (1932-2008), New Zealand cricketer
 Donald McLeod (Trinidadian cricketer) (born 1963), Trinidadian cricketer
 Don MacLeod (businessman) (born 1947), South African cricketer and businessman
 Donnie McLeod (motorcyclist), participant in events such as the 1988 French motorcycle Grand Prix

Military
 Donald McLeod (Loyalist), British army officer in Battle of Moore's Creek Bridge
 Donald McLeod (Upper Canada Rebellion) (1779–1879), figure in the Upper Canada Rebellion
 Donald Kenneth McLeod (1885–1958), officer in the British Army

Others
 A. Donald Macleod (born 1938), church historian
 Don McLeod (Aboriginal rights activist), Western Australian Aboriginal rights activist, see Pilbara#20th century
 Donald Macleod (theologian) (born 1940), Scottish theologian
 Donald MacLeod (piper)  (1917–1982), Scottish pipe major
 Donny MacLeod (1932–1984), Scottish TV presenter
 Donald Macleod (surgeon), (born 1941), Scottish surgeon
 Donald Macleod (radio), BBC Radio 3 Presenter, 1982-Present 
 Donald Bannerman Macleod (1887–1972), New Zealand molecular physicist